Tommy Davis (October 13, 1934 – April 2, 1987) was an American football punter and kicker.

College football
Davis was a member of the national championship winning 1958 LSU Tigers football team.

NFL
He played from 1959 to 1969 for the San Francisco 49ers. He was selected to the Pro Bowl after the 1962 and 1963 seasons, and was a second-team All-Pro in 1965.

Davis scored 738 points in his 10 year career. Three hundred and forty eight were extra points. He missed only two extra points in his career. He made 130 field goals of his 276 attempts.

Davis died of Lung Cancer on April 2, 1987 in San Bruno, CA.

References

1934 births
American football placekickers
American football punters
LSU Tigers football players
National Conference Pro Bowl players
Players of American football from Shreveport, Louisiana
San Francisco 49ers players
Western Conference Pro Bowl players
1987 deaths